Chrysoritis henningi is a species of butterfly in the family Lycaenidae. It is endemic to South Africa. It mostly treated as a subspecies of Chrysoritis pan.

Sources
 

Chrysoritis
Butterflies described in 1981
Endemic butterflies of South Africa
Taxonomy articles created by Polbot
Taxobox binomials not recognized by IUCN